P'arnajom or P'arnajob (ფარნაჯობი) (died 90 BC) was a king of Iberia from 109 to 90 BC, the fourth in the P'arnavaziani line. He is known exclusively from the royal list included in the medieval Georgian chronicles.

He succeeded on death of his father, Mirian I in 109 BC. He is reported to have added another idol, that of the god Zaden, to the Iberian pagan pantheon, and to have built a fortress to house it. His policy of importing foreign religion is said to have caused a general uprising. The chronicle goes on to describe a great battle between P'arnajom and his nobles in which the king is defeated and killed, and the crown given to his son-in-law, Arshak/Artaxias, son of the king of Armenia, the rebels' ally. P'arnajom's son, Mirian (Mirvan), survives, however, to be taken and brought up at the Parthian court.

References 
Thomson, Robert W. (1996), Rewriting Caucasian History: The Medieval Armenian Adaptation of the Georgian Chronicles, p. 42. Oxford University Press, .
Rapp, Stephen H. (2003), Studies In Medieval Georgian Historiography: Early Texts And Eurasian Contexts, pp. 282–284. Peeters Bvba .
Toumanoff, Cyril. Chronology of the Early Kings of Iberia. Traditio 25 (1969), pp. 10–11.

90 BC deaths
Pharnavazid kings of Iberia
2nd-century BC rulers in Asia
1st-century BC rulers in Asia
Year of birth unknown